Chicão may refer to:

People

Football
Chicão (footballer, born 1949) (1949–2008), born Francisco Jezuíno Avanzi, Brazilian defensive midfielder
Chicão (footballer, born 1962), born Francisco Carlos Martins Vidal, Brazilian football forward
Chicão (footballer, born February 1979), born Francisco Alves dos Santos, Brazilian defensive midfielder
Chicão (footballer, born December 1979), born José João de Jesus, Brazilian defensive midfielder
Chicão (footballer, born 1981), born Anderson Sebastião Cardoso, Brazilian defender

Other
Chicão language, alternative name to Ikpeng language, indigenous language in Brazil

See also
Chico (disambiguation)